GERRI, an acronym for geriatric evaluation by relative's rating instrument, is a diagnostic tool for rating cognitive function, social function and mood in geriatric patients.

References

Further reading

Dementia
Medical tests